Frank Merlin Troeh (February 19, 1882 – December 24, 1968) was an Olympian who won a silver and a gold medal in trap shooting for the United States at the 1920 Summer Olympics in Antwerp, Belgium.

Troeh grew up in North Dakota. He moved to Washington, and later to Oregon, where he dominated the sport at all levels for more than 20 years. From 1913 through 1930, he was among the top 25 singles average leaders every year. In 1934, he won all four championship events at the Oregon State Shoot: singles, handicap, doubles and all-around, the first time the feat had been accomplished. Troeh continued to compete and win well into the 1950s.

Troeh died in 1968 at the age of 86. He was inducted in the National Trapshooting Hall of Fame in 1970, and was an inaugural member of the Oregon Sports Hall of Fame in 1980. He was born in Sioux City, Iowa and died in Portland, Oregon.

References

External links
 databaseOlympics
 Profile in National Trapshooting Hall of Fame

1882 births
1968 deaths
American male sport shooters
Sportspeople from Sioux City, Iowa
Olympic silver medalists for the United States in shooting
Olympic gold medalists for the United States in shooting
Sportspeople from North Dakota
Shooters at the 1920 Summer Olympics
Sportspeople from Oregon
Trap and double trap shooters
Sportspeople from Iowa
Medalists at the 1920 Summer Olympics
19th-century American people
20th-century American people